This article lists all hospitals in Essex County, England.

Open 
Southend University Hospital
Basildon University Hospital
Broomfield Hospital
Princess Alexandra Hospital, Harlow
St Peter's Hospital, Maldon

Closed 
Chelmsford and Essex Hospital
South Ockendon Hospital
St John's Hospital, Chelmsford
St Michael's Hospital, Braintree
William Julien Courtauld Hospital

Essex